Remide Olcay Neyzi (27 July 1927 – 3 February 2022) was a Turkish doctor and the former Director of the Department of Pediatrics, Istanbul Faculty of Medicine (1979–1994). As the first author of the most comprehensive pediatric textbook in Turkish, she greatly contributed to improving the level of medical education in Turkey.

Biography 
Neyzi was born in Istanbul, Turkey, the daughter of Şükrü Ataman.

From 1979 to 1994, she was the Head of Department of Pediatrics at Istanbul Faculty of Medicine, as well as the Director of Institute of Child Health, University of Istanbul. During that time, Olcay Neyzi initiated the Woman and Child Research and Education Unit within the hospital area of the Istanbul Faculty of Medicine. She also initiated the Family Health Department with a multidisciplinary team within the Institute of Child Health at Istanbul University.

Neyzi died on 3 February 2022, at the age of 94. Her two children are Mehmet Ali Neyzi and Leyla Neyzi.

References

External links 
 Istanbul Child Health Association

1927 births
2022 deaths
20th-century Turkish physicians
20th-century women physicians
Turkish medical researchers
Book editors
Turkish women physicians
Turkish physicians
Academic staff of Istanbul University
Turkish pediatricians
Physicians from Istanbul